Shabran District is one of the 66 districts of Azerbaijan. It is located in the north-east of the country and belongs to the Guba-Khachmaz Economic Region. The district borders the districts of Khachmaz, Quba, Khizi and Siyazan. Its capital and largest city is Shabran. As of 2020, the district had a population of 59,900.

History 
The district was formed as Davachi District on August 8, 1930. It was abolished and included into Absheron District in 1963, however, two years later, the district was re-established. In 1992, the new Siazan District was formed south of modern Shabran District by the order of the National Assembly of Azerbaijan, which included part of Davachi District's territory. In 2010, the district was renamed Shabran District.

Geography 
The greater part of the district is mountainous. The Caspian Sea is located 12 km from Shabran city. The district borders upon Quba, Khachmaz, Shamakhi and Siazan Districts. Forests occupy 27000 ha in mountainous territories and plains near the Caspian Sea and they are of great importance with their climatic and natural resources for the district. The Shabran and Davachi Rivers flow through the district's territory, and the Valvalachay and Gilgilchay Rivers flow in northern and southern borders directly to the Caspian Sea. Samur-Davachi lowland has an altitude of −28 m below the world ocean level.

Shabran District is located in the north-eastern part of the Greater Caucasus. There are also mud volcanoes in the area. Breeds of the Cretaceous, Paleogene and Neogene periods spread in mountainous parts, but breeds of Anthropogenic period spread in low-lying parts. The territory is rich of oil, gas, gravel, sand, clay and other natural resources. Medicinal mineral waters, “Galaalty” sanatorium, high-temperature Khaltan springs are broadly used by the population.

The climate in low-lands and low-mountainous parts is warm and subtropical, but in mountainous is mild cold. Summer of the district is dry and the amount of annual precipitation is not more than 300–600 mm. Brown mountainous-forest, mountainous-chestnut, light-chestnut soils spread in mountainous, but alkaline, grey, brown and other soils spread in low-lying parts. There are sandstones on the seashore. Vegetation cover consists of bush tangles, rare forest meadows, semi-deserts covered with glades or semi-deserts covered both with glades and saline. The district is rich for its fauna and birds of various species.

Population 
According to the annual report of the State Statistical Committee, every year the total number of population is increasing. In comparison to 2010, the statistic indicator for the population raised by 6,500 thousand and reached 58,700 people in 2018. There is an increase of approximately 12.5 percent. 29,900 of the population is men and 28,800 percent is women. At the beginning of 2018, the number of young people in age 14–29 in the region is 15,100 people. Among these, 7.8 are men and 7.3 are women.

The majority of the population in the district are Azerbaijanis (54,942), the second biggest ethnic group are Tats. According to the 2009 census, the ethnic distribution is as below:

Economy of district 
According to 2014 data Overall production reaches 165902.4 thousand manats. The main sectors of this district are building (42107.9 manats) and agriculture (83113.8 manats). The overall income of the district is 4561.3 thousand manats and spending equals 11825.6 thousand manats according to the 2014 statistic.

Historical monuments 
One of the oldest monument is Chirag Gala in the Charmin Village.  It's located on a  slope and was built in the fifth-sixth centuries.

The Silk Road passed through the territory of the modern district, including its capital Shabran. It was one of the locations for caravans of camels to stay and rest.

References 

 
Districts of Azerbaijan